"Your Betrayal" is a song by Welsh heavy metal band Bullet for My Valentine and was released as the first and lead US single from their third album, Fever. The song was set for release on 8 March 2010 to the radio; and, unexpectedly, was released early as a Digital 45 on iTunes along with the track "Begging for Mercy" on 2 March 2010. Before that, "Begging for Mercy" was offered for free download on 14 February 2010 from the band's official website for a limited time. "Your Betrayal" was nominated for the Kerrang! Award for Best Single.

Music video
The music video for the song premiered on 12 April 2010, which was directed by P. R. Brown. The video features the band playing while fire is in the background. Scenes behind the flames show two girls, identical twin actress/models Ginamarie Russo and Annamarie Russo, committing each of the seven deadly sins.  The twins can be seen as each of the deadly sins and performing side by side for the deadly sin "Pride". The video ends with the screen fully engulfed in flames.

As of May 2022, the song has over 80 million views on YouTube.

Track listing
Digital 45
"Your Betrayal" – 4:52
"Begging for Mercy" – 3:55

Personnel
Bullet for My Valentine
Matthew "Matt" Tuck – lead vocals, rhythm guitar, guitar solo intro
Jason "Jay" James – bass guitar, backing vocals
Michael "Padge" Paget – lead guitar
Michael "Moose" Thomas – drums

Production
Produced by Don Gilmore
Mixed by Chris Lord-Alge
Mastered by Ted Jensen
Music video directed by Paul R. Brown

In popular culture
The song is featured on the soundtrack for NHL 11, as well as being released as downloadable content for Rock Band 3. The song was also used in the TV spot for the film Salt.

Charts

References

External links
 Official music video

2010 singles
Bullet for My Valentine songs
2010 songs
Songs written by Matthew Tuck
Songs written by Michael Paget
Songs written by Jason James (musician)
Jive Records singles
Songs written by Don Gilmore (record producer)